The following is a list of notable deaths in June 2013.

Entries for each day are listed alphabetically by surname. A typical entry lists information in the following sequence:
Name, age, country of citizenship and reason for notability, established cause of death, reference.

June 2013

1
Oliver Bernard, 87, English poet and translator.
Newbold Black, 83, American Olympic hockey player.
William Cartwright, 92, American Emmy Award-winning film documentarian and editor, conservationist of the Watts Towers, natural causes.
Frank Dempsey, 88, American football player (Chicago Bears, Hamilton Tiger-Cats). 
Carl Elsener Sr., 90, Swiss entrepreneur.
Jelena Genčić, 76, Serbian handball and tennis player and coach.
Mott Green, 47, American chocolatier, co-founder of the Grenada Chocolate Company,  electrocuted.
Bill Gunston, 86, British aviation writer.
Ian P. Howard, 85, Canadian psychologist, cancer.
James Kelleher, 82, Canadian politician, MP for Sault Ste. Marie (1984–1988), member of the Senate (1990–2005), heart failure.
Atle Kittang, 72, Norwegian literary researcher and critic.
Hanfried Lenz, 97, German mathematician.
Joseph-André Motte, 88, French furniture designer.
Alixa Naff, 93, Lebanese-born American historian, expert on Arab immigration to the United States.
Dorothy Napangardi, 60s, Australian indigenous artist, traffic collision. 
Paul Olefsky, 87, American cellist (Philadelphia Orchestra, Detroit Symphony Orchestra).
Leo Piek, 85, Dutch Olympic wrestler.
Jane Purves, 63, Canadian politician and newspaper editor (Halifax Chronicle Herald), Nova Scotia MLA for Halifax Citadel (1999–2003), cancer.
Edward Cornelius Reed Jr., 88, American senior (former chief) judge, District Court for Nevada (since 1979), natural causes.
Sir Bernard Schreier, 95, Austrian-born British businessman.
Basil Soper, British actor, 74–75.
Janie Thompson, 91, American missionary and academic.

2

Mario Bernardi, 82, Canadian conductor and pianist.
Bruce Cathie, 83, New Zealand UFO author and theorist.
Marco Frascari, 68, Italian architect.
Chen Xitong, 84, Chinese politician, Mayor of Beijing, cancer.
Andrew Doughty, 96, British anaesthetist.
John Gilbert, Baron Gilbert, 86, British politician and life peer, MP for Dudley (1970–1974), Dudley East (1974–1997) and Minister for Transport (1975–1976).
Margaret Jackson, 96, British Special Operations Executive secretary.
Nick Keir, 60, Scottish musician, cancer.
Sverre Magelssen, 95, Norwegian priest.
Frank J. Magill, 86, American federal judge, member of the Eighth Circuit Court of Appeals.
MickDeth, 35, American heavy metal bassist (Eighteen Visions, Bleeding Through), pre-existing heart condition.
Rob Morsberger, 53, American rock and roll singer and songwriter, glioblastoma.
Togrul Narimanbekov, 83, Azerbaijani artist.
Ron Smith, 70, American football player (Chicago Bears, Atlanta Falcons, Los Angeles Rams), lung cancer.
Jalal Al-Din Taheri, 87, Iranian Islamic cleric.
Preston Ward, 85, American baseball player (Pittsburgh Pirates, Cleveland Indians, Kansas City Athletics).
Keith Wilson, 96, American classical musician, teacher and conductor.
Mandawuy Yunupingu, 56, Australian musician (Yothu Yindi), kidney disease.

3

Yves Bertrand, 69, French intelligence chief (Renseignements Généraux, 1992–2004).
Will D. Campbell, 88, American Baptist minister, civil rights leader, author and lecturer, complications of a stroke.
Atul Chitnis, 51, German-born Indian IT specialist, open source advocate and editor of PCQuest, intestinal cancer.
Józef Czyrek, 84, Polish politician.
G. R. Edmund, 82, Indian politician, Tamil Nadu MLA for Tiruchendur and Tirunelveli, multiple organ failure.
Arnold Eidus, 90, American violinist.
Howard Grief, 73, Canadian–born Israeli attorney. 
Shahnaz Himmeti, Afghani politician, MP for Herat, traffic collision.
Eugênio Izecksohn, 81, Brazilian herpetologist (Izecksohn's Toad), professor and author.
Deacon Jones, 74, American Hall of Fame football player (Los Angeles Rams), coined the term "sack", natural causes.
Farid Khan, Pakistani politician, Khyber Pakhtunkhwa MLA for Hangu, shot. 
Jiah Khan, 25, American-born Indian actress, suicide by hanging.
Frank Lautenberg, 89, American politician, member of the United States Senate for New Jersey (1982–2001, since 2003), complications of pneumonia.
Enrique Lizalde, 76, Mexican actor.
Vbos The Kentuckian, 11, Flat-Coated Retriever show dog, respiratory failure.
Stanley T. Walker, 90, American Olympic biathlete.

4
Walt Arfons, 96, American land speed record holder.
Martin Arnold, 84, American journalist, editor and columnist (The New York Times), complications of Parkinson's disease.
Auguste Cazalet, 74, French politician, Senator for Pyrénées-Atlantiques.
Rudolph M. Clay, 77, American politician, member of the Indiana Senate (1972–1976), Mayor of Gary, Indiana (2006–2011), prostate cancer.
Joey Covington, 67, American musician (Jefferson Airplane, Hot Tuna), traffic collision.
John Crawley, 73, American judge, member of the Alabama Court of Civil Appeals (1995–2007).
Monti Davis, 54, American basketball player (Philadelphia 76ers, Dallas Mavericks).
Hermann Gunnarsson, 66, Icelandic broadcaster, footballer and handball player.
Pekka Hämäläinen, 74, Finnish football player and executive, President of the Football Association of Finland (1997–2009).
John B. Heilman, 92, American politician, member of the South Dakota House of Representatives (1953–1954).
Carlos Hoffmann, 77, Chilean footballer.
Gaston Isabelle, 92, Canadian doctor and politician, MP for Hull—Aylmer (1968–1988). 
Austin M. Lee, 93, American politician, member of the Pennsylvania House of Representatives (1956–1964), Pennsylvania State Ethics Commission (1991–2001).
Luo Meizhen, 127?, Chinese unverified claimant for world's oldest person, natural causes.
Sir Patrick Nairne, 91, British civil servant, Permanent Secretary to the Department of Health and Social Security (1975–1981).
Zinia Pinto, 83, Indian Roman Catholic nun and educationalist.
Samani Pulepule, 89, Samoan religious leader, Chairman of the Samoan Assemblies of God. 
S. Shamsuddin, 84, Singaporean actor.
Ben Tucker, 82, American jazz musician, traffic collision.
Will Wynn, 64, American football player (Philadelphia Eagles), heart failure.

5

Sir James Bottomley, 92, British diplomat, Ambassador to South Africa (1973–76).
Don Bowman, 75, American comedian, country singer and songwriter ("Just to Satisfy You").
Dave Elias, 43, Canadian curler, liver cancer.
Takkō Ishimori, 81, Japanese voice actor (One Piece, Magic Knight Rayearth).
Kampta Karran, 56, Guyanese sociologist and author.
Franz Kelch, 97, German singer.
Hermann Lotter, 73, German Olympic swimmer.
Helen McElhone, 80, British politician, MP for Glasgow Queen's Park (1982–83).
Scarlet Moon de Chevalier, 62, Brazilian actress, journalist and writer, multiple system atrophy.
Stanisław Nagy, 91, Polish Roman Catholic prelate, Cardinal of Santa Maria della Scala (since 2003).
Lonappan Nambadan, 77, Indian politician, kidney ailment.
Ruairí Ó Brádaigh, 80, Irish politician, TD for Longford–Westmeath (1957–61), President of Sinn Féin (1970–83) and Republican Sinn Féin (1987–2009).
Michel Ostyn, 88, Belgian sports scientist.
 Balan Pandit, 86, Indian cricketer.
Annabel Tollman, 39, Belgian-born American fashion journalist and magazine editor, blood clot.
Katherine Woodville, 74, English-born American actress (Posse, The Informers), cancer.

6
Erling Blöndal Bengtsson, 81, Danish cellist.
Stan Gorton, 67, Australian rugby league footballer.
Elmer Guckert, 84, American baseball umpire.
Mohamed Hachaichi, 62, Algerian Olympic wrestler.
Nada Inada, 83, Japanese psychiatrist and writer.
Jerome Karle, 94, American biochemist, Nobel Prize laureate (1985), member of the Manhattan Project.
Elaine Laron, 83, American songwriter and lyricist (The Electric Company, Captain Kangaroo), pneumonia.
Rafael Marquina, 91, Spanish inventor, designer and architect.
Jeffrey Mathews, 70, South African cricketer.
Jack McGrath, 89, Australian footballer.
Eugen Merzbacher, 92, German-born American physicist.
Gennady Nikolayev, 76, Russian Soviet Olympic swimmer.
Jules Schwartz, 85, American computer scientist.
Tom Sharpe, 85, British author (Porterhouse Blue, Wilt), complications from diabetes.
Maxine Stuart, 94, American actress (Kitten with a Whip, Days of Wine and Roses), natural causes.
Malcolm Todd, 73, British historian and archaeologist.
Esther Williams, 91, American swimmer (Billy Rose's Aquacade) and actress (Million Dollar Mermaid, Dangerous When Wet), natural causes.

7
Rachel Abrams, 62, American writer, editor and artist, wife of Elliott Abrams, stomach cancer.
Ekkayuth Anchanbutr, 58, Thai businessman and political activist, homicide.
Lesley Cantwell, 26, New Zealand racewalker, suspected subarachnoid haemorrhage.
Mirosław Car, 52, Polish footballer.
Charlie Coles, 71, American basketball coach (Central Michigan University, 1985–1991; Miami University, 1996–2012).
Harvey Dunn, Jr., 81, Australian football player (Carlton).
Tom Fitzgerald, 74, Irish politician, member of the Seanad Éireann.
Donna Hartley, 58, English Olympic bronze medallist runner (1980).
Ken Kinkor, 59, American pirate historian (Whydah Galley).
David Lyon, 72, British actor.
Florin Mașala, 79, Romanian football player.
Pierre Mauroy, 84, French politician, Prime Minister (1981–1984), member of Senate for Nord (1992–2011), lung cancer.
Christopher Pearson, 61, Australian journalist, political speech-writer, founder of the Adelaide Review.
J. V. Raghavulu, 82, Indian playback singer and musical director.
Richard Ramirez, 53, American serial killer, complications from B-cell lymphoma and hepatitis-C.
Malu Rocha, 65, Brazilian actress, prion.
Mark Starr, 50, American professional wrestler, heart attack.
Kenneth R. Shoulders, 86, American experimental physicist.
Joseph Michael Sullivan, 83, American Roman Catholic prelate, Auxiliary Bishop of Brooklyn (1980–2005), injuries sustained in a traffic collision.
Juan Ignacio Torres Landa, 57, Mexican politician, President of the Chamber of Deputies (1992), helicopter crash.
Amelia Wood, 82, American Olympic javelin thrower.

8
John Boyd, 93, American science fiction author.
 Paul Cellucci, 65, American politician and diplomat, Governor of Massachusetts (1997–2001), Ambassador to Canada (2001–2005), amyotrophic lateral sclerosis. 
Stumpy Cromer, 92, American comedian and dancer (Stump and Stumpy, DuBarry Was a Lady).
Nathan Dean, 79, American politician, member of the Georgia House of Representatives (1962–1974) and Senate (1974–2004).
Niels Diffrient, 84, American industrial designer, cancer.
Charles M. Hudson, 80–81, American anthropologist.
Beril Jents, 95, Australian fashion designer.
Yoram Kaniuk, 83, Israeli writer, painter, journalist, and theater critic, cancer.
Taufiq Kiemas, 70, Indonesian politician, Speaker of the People's Consultative Assembly (since 2009), heart attack.
Jaimie Leonard, 39, American soldier, arms-related injury.
Raymond McCormick, 82, Australian cricketer.
Angus MacKay, 86, British actor (Doctor Who).
Kyle Miller, 31, Canadian lacrosse player, cancer.
Hugh Murray, 90, British historian.
Ahad Rajabli, 51, Azerbaijani martial artist, world champion in sambo, suicide by hanging. 
Eugene P. Ruehlmann, 88, American politician, Mayor of Cincinnati (1967–1971).
Richard J. Seitz, 95, American army officer.
Udham Singh, Indian Maoist militant, shot.
Willi Sitte, 92, German painter.
Evert Sodergren, 92, American studio furniture maker.
José Sosa, 60, Dominican baseball player (Houston Astros).
Derrick Townshend, 69, Zimbabwean cricketer.
Arturo Vega, 65, Mexican-born American punk graphic designer and artistic director (The Ramones), cancer.
Philip White, 89, Canadian politician, Mayor of York, Ontario (1970–1978).

9
Iain Banks, 59, Scottish author (The Wasp Factory), gallbladder cancer.
Bruno Bartoletti, 86, Italian conductor. 
Martin Bernal, 76, British scholar, myelofibrosis.
Ralph Bogan, 90, American businessman and part-owner of the Atlanta Braves.
John Burke, 65, British rugby league player.
Darondo, 67, American soul singer, heart failure.
Wahab Dosunmu, 74, Nigerian politician, member of the Senate (1999–2003).
K. T. Francis, 73, Sri Lankan cricket umpire, complications of diabetes.
Ward Goodenough, 94, American anthropologist.
J. Eugene Grigsby, 94, American educator.
Franz Halberg, 93, Romanian biologist.
Walter Jens, 90, German writer and intellectual, dementia.
Harry Lewis, 93, American actor (Key Largo) and restaurateur, natural causes.
Noel McMahon, 97, New Zealand cricketer.
Chechenol Mongush, 41, Russian Olympic wrestler (1996), strangled.
Solomon Oboh, 23, Nigerian footballer (Warri Wolves), traffic collision.
Rudolf Pöder, 88, Austrian politician, President of the National Council (1989–1990).
Elías Querejeta, 78, Spanish film producer.
Zdeněk Rotrekl, 92, Czech poet.
Dilip Sarkar, 64, Indian politician, West Bengal MLA for Barabani, shot.
Seong Moy, 92, Chinese-born American painter and printmaker.
Edward Stevens, 80, American Olympic gold medal-winning rower (1952).
Joe Tereshinski, Sr., 89, American football player (Washington Redskins).
Edith Thomas, 86, Chilean Olympian

10
Timothy Apiyo, 70s, Tanzanian politician and civil servant.
Doug Bailey, 79, American political consultant.
Ernst H. Beutner, 89, American microbiologist.
Jacques Bialski, 83, French politician, member of the Senate for Nord (1979–1997).
Gladys Clarke, 90,  British javelin thrower.
Valentin de Vargas, 79, American actor (Touch of Evil, Hatari!, To Live and Die in L.A.).
Allen Derr, 85, American lawyer, won Reed v. Reed sex discrimination case.
Jack Dye, 93, British army officer.
Ralph Graves, 88, American writer, editor and news executive (Time, Life), kidney failure.
Franz Handlos, 73, German politician, MP for Deggendorf (1972–1987).
Petrus Kastenman, 88, Swedish Olympic equestrian (1956).
Alice Kundert, 92, American politician, member of the South Dakota House of Representatives (1990–1994), Secretary of State of South Dakota (1979–1987).
 Louis-Paul M'Fédé, 52, Cameroonian Olympic footballer, lung infection.
Ali Maher, 55, Jordanian artist, architect and teacher, stroke.
Yehoshua Neuwirth, 86, Israeli Jewish scholar and clergy, compiled the Shemirat Shabbat Kehilchatah.
Hector Oaxaca Acosta, 87, Mexican news photographer (Associated Press).
Enrique Orizaola, 91, Spanish footballer.
M. K. Purushothaman, 51, Indian politician, Kerala MLA for Njarackal (2006–2011), heart attack.
Don Roby, 79, English footballer (Notts County F.C., Loughborough United).
Daniel Somers, 30, American soldier, suicide.
Pete Vonachen, 87, American baseball team owner and executive (Peoria Chiefs).
 Barbara Vucanovich, 91, American politician, member of the United States House of Representatives from Nevada's 2nd district (1983–1997).
 joseph allen disilvestro 29 american dies of sucicde

11

Miller Barber, 82, American professional golfer, lymphoma.
Carl W. Bauer, 79, American politician, member of the Louisiana House of Representatives (1966–1972) and Senate (1972–1976).
Sir Henry Cecil, 70, British racehorse trainer, stomach cancer.
John Frederick Clarke, 86, British aeronautical engineer.
Robert Fogel, 86, American economic academic, winner of the Nobel Memorial Prize in Economic Sciences (1993).
James Grimsley, Jr., 91, American military officer and academic, President of The Citadel (1980–1989).
Andreas Kilingaridis, 36, Russian-born Greek Olympic kayaker (2000, 2004, 2008), leukaemia.
Olavio López Duque, 81, Colombian Roman Catholic prelate, Vicar Apostolic of Casanare (1977–1999).
Murray Mitchell, 90, American basketball player.
Rory Morrison, 48, British radio announcer and newsreader (BBC Radio 4), lymphoma.
Aleksandr Nalivkin, 26, Russian footballer, cancer.
Kristiāns Pelšs, 20, Latvian ice hockey player, drowning.
Stephen Porter, 87, American stage director.
Vidya Charan Shukla, 84, Indian politician, MP for Mahasamund, Minister of External Affairs (1990–1991), injuries sustained in a shooting.
Johnny Smith, 90, American jazz guitarist and songwriter ("Walk, Don't Run"), natural causes.
Charles Spielberger, 85–86, American clinical psychologist.
Thyra Thomson, 96, American politician, Secretary of State of Wyoming (1963–1987).
Jaakko Wallenius, 55, Finnish writer and journalist.
Billy Williams, 80, American baseball player (Seattle Pilots).

12
Laslo Babits, 55, Canadian Olympic javelin thrower (1984).
Teresita Barajuen, 105, Spanish Roman Catholic laity, believed to hold record for longest service in cloister.
Elroy Chester, 44, American criminal, execution by lethal injection.
Fatai Rolling Dollar, 86, Nigerian musician.
John Groppo, 92, American politician, member of the Connecticut House of Representatives (1959–1985).
Hugo Gutierrez, Jr., 86, Filipino jurist, Associate Justice of the Supreme Court (1982–1993), complications of diabetes.
Helen Brush Jenkins, 94, American news photographer (Los Angeles Daily News).
Michael Kasha, 92, American molecular biophysicist, complications of pneumonia.
Jiroemon Kimura, 116, Japanese supercentenarian, verified oldest man in history, oldest verified living person in the world, natural causes.
Jason Leffler, 37, American racing driver (NASCAR, IndyCar), blunt force neck injury from race collision.
José de Lima, 89, Brazilian Roman Catholic prelate, Bishop of Itumbiara (1973–1981) and Sete Lagoas (1981–1999).
Dick Mansperger, 80, American football player and coach, cancer.
Ethel Marshall, 89, American badminton player.
Teodoro Matos Santana, 66, Brazilian footballer (São Paulo FC), pancreatic cancer.
Pa Odiase, 79, Nigerian composer ("Arise, O Compatriots").
Cheryl Peake, 47, British Olympic ice skater (1988).
Soh Hang-suen, 61, Hong Kong actress (Life Without Principle), complications of diabetes and stroke.
Gavin Taylor, 72, British television and concert film director, (The Tube, U2 at Red Rocks, Queen at Wembley), cancer.
Barry Till, 90, British scholar and educator.
Joseph A. Unanue, 88, American chief executive (Goya Foods).

13
 Mohammed Al-Khilaiwi, 41, Saudi Olympic and World Cup footballer (1994, 1998), cardiac arrest.
David Deutsch, 84, American advertising executive, founder and CEO of Deutsch Inc. (1969–1989), natural causes.
Newton Lai, 62, Chinese Hong Kong actor, pneumonia.
Philippe Massu, 60, French sailor (sport).
Sam Most, 82, American jazz flautist, cancer.
Ajit Pandey, 75, Indian pop singer and politician, West Bengal MLA for Bowbazar, heart attack.
Edmund Pellegrino, 92, American bioethicist and academic, President of The Catholic University of America (1978–1982).
Hans Petersen, 83, Danish Olympic boxer.
Maxwell Nicholas Sparks, 92, New Zealand air force officer.
Brett Usher, 66, English actor, writer and ecclesiastical historian, pancreatic cancer.
Kenji Utsumi, 75, Japanese voice actor (Fist of the North Star, Dragon Ball, Fullmetal Alchemist), cancerous peritonitis.
Albert White Hat, 74, American Lakota language teacher and activist.

14
Betty Burstall, 87, Australian theatre director, founder of La Mama Theatre.
Rod Bushie, 60, Canadian Anishinaabe elder, Grand Chief of Assembly of Manitoba Chiefs (1997–2000), lung cancer.
Olav Sigurd Carlsen, 82, Norwegian politician.
Geraldine Decker, 82, American operatic mezzo-soprano (Seattle Opera, Metropolitan Opera).
Pa Dillon, 75, Irish hurler. 
Al Green, 57, American professional wrestler (WCW), chronic obstructive pulmonary disease.
Johnny Linaker, 86, English footballer.
Martin Lowson, 75, English aeronautical engineer.
Hugh Maguire, 86, Irish violinist.
Gene Mako, 97, American tennis player, doubles winner at US Open (1936, 1938) and Wimbledon (1937, 1938), inducted into International Tennis Hall of Fame (1973).
James W. Mayer, American physical chemist.
Monica Ross, 62, British artist, academic, and feminist, cancer.
Elroy Schwartz, 89, American television writer (Gilligan's Island, The Brady Bunch, Wonder Woman), complications from surgery.
Tom Tall, 75, American rockabilly singer.
Olwen Wymark, 81, American-born British dramatist.

15
Kamu de Almeida, 73, Angolan diplomat, Ambassador to the Congo, Spain and Egypt.
Tatiana Belinky, 94, Russian-born Brazilian children's author, poet, screenwriter (Sítio do Pica-pau Amarelo, O Jardineiro Espanhol) and journalist, Prêmio Jabuti laureate (1990, 1994).
Peride Celal, 97, Turkish author.
Satyapal Dang, 93, Indian politician, Punjab MLA for Amritsar West (1967–1980).
Heinz Flohe, 65, German footballer (1. FC Köln), member of World Cup-winning team (1974), complications from a stroke.
Edgar Gilbert, 89, American mathematician.
 José Froilán González, 90, Argentine racing driver, respiratory failure.
Doreen Hawkins, 93, British actress.
Joseph Hibbert, 65, Jamaican politician, MP for St. Andrew East Rural (2002–2011),  Minister for Transport and Works, heart attack.
Helen Hughes, 84, Czechoslovakian-born Australian economist, complications following surgery.
 Elena Ivashchenko, 28, Russian Olympic judoka, suicide by jumping from building.
Thomas Penfield Jackson, 76, American senior judge, member of the US District Court for D.C. (1982–2004), cancer.
Stanley A. Johnson, 88, American politician, member of the South Dakota House of Representatives (1968–1977).
Walter Kahn, 65, American record producer, kidney failure.
Sakaida Kakiemon XIV, 78, Japanese potter, Living National Treasure, cancer.
Stan Lopata, 87, American baseball player (Philadelphia Phillies), complications of a cardiac condition.
 Manivannan, 58, Indian actor and director, heart attack.
Evaristo Márquez, 73, Colombian actor.
Dennis O'Rourke, 67, Australian documentary film maker, cancer.
Wangnia Pongte, 60, Indian footballer and politician, Arunachal Pradesh MLA for Changlang North (1990–2009), traffic collision.
Maurice Priestley, 80, British mathematician.
Harry Rozmiarek, 74, American veterinarian.
Paul Soros, 87, Hungarian-born American mechanical engineer and philanthropist.
Kenneth G. Wilson, 77, American physicist, Nobel Prize laureate (1982), lymphoma.
Syd Young, 95, Australian footballer (South Melbourne).

16
Sam Farber, 88, American industrial designer, co-founder of OXO, complications from a fall.
Peggy Fenton, 85, American baseball player.
T. Ed Garrison, Jr., 91, American politician, member of the South Carolina House of Representatives (1956–1967) and Senate (1967–1986), natural causes.
Frank Greenaway, 95, British museum curator.
Roy Grow, 71, American political scientist.
Hans Hass, 94, Austrian diving pioneer.
Khondakar Ashraf Hossain, 63, Bangladesh poet and academic, heart attack. 
Isaiah Jesudason, 88, Malayali bishop.
Josip Kuže, 60, Croatian football player and manager (Dinamo Zagreb), leukaemia.
Richard Marlow, 74, English organist and choral director, Non-hodgkin lymphoma.
James Massey, 79, American information theorist, cancer. 
TKM Bava Musliyar, 82, Indian Muslim scholar and educationalist.
Maurice Nadeau, 102, French writer and editor.
Dwight Pattison, 51, Indian musician, heart attack.
Daya Perera, Sri Lankan diplomat and lawyer, Ambassador to the United Nations (1988–1991). 
B. Raman, 77, Indian intelligence officer, co-founder of the Research and Analysis Wing, cancer.
Bernard Sahlins, 90, American comedy writer and theater owner, founder of The Second City.
D. M. Schurman, 88, Canadian historian. 
Yousef Madani Tabrizi, 85, Iranian Grand Ayatollah. 
Colette Urban, 61, Canadian/American artist, cancer.
Ottmar Walter, 89, German footballer (1. FC Kaiserslautern), member of 1954 World Cup-winning team.

17
Michael Baigent, 65, New Zealand author (The Holy Blood and the Holy Grail), brain haemorrhage.
Carmen Carrozza, 91, Italian-born American accordionist.
Atiqul Haque Chowdhury, 82, Bangladeshi playwright and TV producer.
Pierre F. Côté, 85, Canadian civil servant, Chief Electoral Officer of Quebec (1978–1997).
Bulbs Ehlers, 90, American basketball and baseball player.
Jim Goddard, 77, English film and television director (Fox).
Michael Goldie, 81, British character actor.
Irwin Held, 87, American restaurateur (Barney's Beanery), natural causes.
James Holshouser, 78, American politician, Governor of North Carolina (1973–1977).
Fuller Kimbrell, 103, American politician, member of the Alabama Senate (1946–1955).
Werner Lang, 91, German automotive engineer. 
Albert Legogie, 76, Nigerian politician, member of the Senate for Edo North, malaria.
Ma Xianda, 81, Chinese martial artist.
Peter Millar, 62, Scottish footballer (Motherwell), brain tumour.
Jalil Shahnaz, 92, Iranian maestro and Tar master, natural causes.
Ray Stone, 89, American politician and educator, Mayor of Coeur d'Alene, Idaho (1986–1994).
Geoff Strong, 75, English footballer (Arsenal, Liverpool).
Tom Turner, 97, American Negro league baseball player.
Rafael Valek, 80, Colombian footballer.

18

Brent F. Anderson, 80, American politician, Mayor of West Valley City, Utah (1987–1994).
Raghunath Bhattacharyya, 61, Indian judge, member of the Kolkata High Court (since 2010), COPD.
Hugh Burry, 82, New Zealand rugby union player (Canterbury). 
Alastair Donaldson, 58, Scottish musician.
Vernon Fougère, 70, Canadian Roman Catholic prelate, Bishop of Charlottetown (1991–2009).
Gene Freese, 79, American baseball player, complications of back surgery.
Garde Gardom, 88, Canadian politician, British Columbia MLA for Vancouver-Point Grey (1966–1986), Lieutenant-Governor of British Columbia (1995–2001).
Brian P. Goodman, 66, Canadian civil servant, Chair of the Immigration and Refugee Board of Canada, heart arrhythmia.
Michael Hastings, 33, American journalist (Rolling Stone, Newsweek, BuzzFeed), traffic collision.
Norman MacKenzie, 91, English journalist, educationalist and historian.
Jean Melzer, 87, Australian politician, Senator for Victoria (1974–1981).
Imran Khan Mohmand, Pakistani politician, Khyber Pakhtunkhwa MLA for Mardan, bombing.
Dave Petitjean, 85, American Cajun humorist and actor, complications from Alzheimer's disease.
Alfred Planyavsky, 89, Austrian double-bassist and music historian.
Michael Potter, 89, American cancer researcher, recipient of the Albert Lasker Award for Basic Medical Research (1984), acute myeloid leukemia.
Claudio Rocchi, 62, Italian progressive rock singer-songwriter and musician, degenerative disease.
Hassan Sadian, 88–89, Iranian Olympic wrestler.
Ramón Sáez Marzo, 73, Spanish Olympic racing cyclist.
Kukoi Sanyang, 61, Ivorian Gambian revolutionary.
Sir Colin Stansfield Smith, 80, English architect and cricketer.
Vijay Telang, 61, Indian cricketer (Vidarbha).
David Wall, 67, British ballet dancer, cancer.

19
Edward Chindori-Chininga, 58, Zimbabwean politician, MP for Guruve South, Minister of Mines and Mining Development (2000–2004), traffic collision.
Vince Flynn, 47, American author (Mitch Rapp), prostate cancer.
James Gandolfini, 51, American actor (The Sopranos, In the Loop, Crimson Tide), Emmy winner (2000, 2001, 2003), heart attack.
Parke Godwin, 84, American author, natural causes.
Michael Hodgman, 74, Australian federal and Tasmanian politician, MLC (1966–1974), MP (1975–1987), MHA (1992–1998, 2001–2010), emphysema.
Gyula Horn, 80, Hungarian politician, Prime Minister (1994–1998).
John Hughes, 78, Welsh ceramicist, creator of Grogg.
Dave Jennings, 61, American football player (New York Jets, New York Giants), complications from Parkinson's disease.
Danny Kravitz, 82, American baseball player (Pittsburgh Pirates), cancer.
Sait Maden, 82, Turkish translator, poet, painter and graphic designer, pneumonia after bypass surgery.
Alexandru Mușina, 58, Romanian poet.
Paul Mees, 52, Australian academic and lawyer, cancer.
Miguel Morayta, 105, Spanish-born Mexican film director.
Ólafur Rafnsson, 50, Icelandic sports executive, president of FIBA Europe and National Olympic and Sports Association of Iceland.
Alfons Schilling, 79, Swiss painter, Parkinson's disease.
Kim Thompson, 56, American comic book editor and publisher (Fantagraphics Books), lung cancer.
Filip Topol, 48, Czech musician.
Slim Whitman, 90, American country singer-songwriter ("Indian Love Call", "Rose Marie"), heart failure.

20
Fernando Aguilar, 75, Spanish Olympic athlete.
Diosa Costello, 100, American Puerto Rican actress and singer.
Franz Xaver Eder, 87, German Roman Catholic prelate, Bishop of Passau (1984–2001).
Ibrahim Haji Jama Mee'aad, Somali militant (Al-Shabaab), shot.
Vern Pyles, 94, American politician, member of the Pennsylvania House of Representatives (1974–1980), heart disease and cancer.
Dicky Rutnagur, 82, Indian cricket journalist and author.
Ingvar Rydell, 91, Swedish Olympic footballer (1952).
Jean-Louis Scherrer, 78, French fashion designer.
Günter Seibold, 76, German footballer.
Philip Slater, 86, American sociologist and academic, non-Hodgkin's lymphoma.
Manuel Bernardo de Sousa, 81, Angolan diplomat.
Jeffrey Smart, 91, Australian painter, renal failure.
John David Wilson, 93, English animator and producer (Grease, Lady and the Tramp, Peter Pan), dementia.
*Wu Zhengyi, 97, Chinese botanist, winner of the State Science and Technology Prize (2007).
Pu Zoduha, 73, Indian politician, Mizoram nominated MLA (1984–1987), complications from hypertension and diabetes.

21
Huáscar Aparicio, 41, Bolivian folk singer, car accident.
Charles L. Campbell, 82, American sound editor (Back to the Future, E.T. the Extra Terrestrial, The Rocketeer), Oscar winner (1983, 1986, 1989).
Mohan Lal Chakma, 101, Indian politician, Tripura MLA for Penchartal (1978–1983).
Diane Clare, 74, British actress (The Haunting).
N. Dennis, 85, Indian politician, MP for Nagercoil (1980–2003).
Jerry Dexter, 78, American voice actor (Gomer Pyle, U.S.M.C., Josie and the Pussycats). 
Abdol-Aziz Mirza Farmanfarmaian, 93, Iranian architect.
Genaro García, 34, Mexican boxer, shot.
Margret Göbl, 74, German Olympic figure skater (1960).
Dame Barbara Goodman, 80, New Zealand politician.
James P. Gordon, 85, American physicist.
Marcelo Grassmann, 88, Brazilian engraver and draughtsman.
Bernard Hunt, 83, English professional golfer.
Ed Iacobucci, 59, Argentinian-born American technology executive, co-founder of Citrix Systems, pancreatic cancer.
Mina Izadyar, 63, Iranian professor and pediatrician, cancer.
Jacqueline Livingston, 69, American photographer.
Mary Love, 69, American soul and gospel singer.
Edgar Mann, 86, British Manx politician, Chairman of the Executive Council (1981–1985), complications of cancer.
Uzi Meshulam, 60, Israeli rabbi.
Milorad Mišković, 86, Serbian ballet dancer, Chevalier of the Légion d'honneur.
Alen Pamić, 23, Croatian footballer (NK Istra 1961), hypercholesterolemia and coronary artery plaque.
Sajid Qureshi, 53, Pakistani politician, Sindh MLA for Karachi, shot.
Elliott Reid, 93, American actor (Gentlemen Prefer Blondes), heart failure.
Wendy Saddington, 64, Australian jazz and blues singer (Chain), oesophageal cancer.
Alfred O. Schumann, 89, American farmer and politician.
Curtis W. Tarr, 88, American civil servant and academic, head of the Selective Service System during Vietnam, pneumonia.
Per Ung, 80, Norwegian sculptor, cancer.
Zhang Guangdou, 101, Chinese hydraulic engineer and educator.

22
Cameron Baird, 32, Australian soldier, Victoria Cross recipient, shot. 
Robert O. Cox, 95, American politician, Mayor of Fort Lauderdale (1986–1991).
Leandro Díaz, 85, Colombian music composer (Vallenato), acute kidney infection.
Martha Mayer Erlebacher, 75, American artist.
Beverly Fawell, 82, American politician, member of the Illinois House of Representatives (1981–1983) and Illinois Senate (1983–1999), chronic heart failure.
Sergio Focardi, 80, Italian physicist.
Peter Fraser, Baron Fraser of Carmyllie, 68, Scottish politician and advocate, MP (1979–1987), Lord Advocate (1989–1992), Solicitor General (1982–1989).
Gary David Goldberg, 68, American screenwriter and director (Family Ties, Must Love Dogs, Dad), Emmy winner (1979, 1987), brain cancer.
Alexander Grunauer, 91, Russian scientist.
Donald Hustad, 94, American evangelical church musician, academic and author.
Jan Jaskólski, 73, Polish Olympic athlete.
Henning Larsen, 87, Danish architect, natural causes.
Loránd Lohinszky, 88, Hungarian actor and academic.
Deric Longden, 77, British author and screenwriter, cancer.
Allan Simonsen, 34, Danish racing driver, complications from a race collision during 2013 24 Hours of Le Mans.
Javier Tomeo, 80, Spanish writer, infection and diabetes.
Jesús Humberto Velázquez Garay, 73, Mexican Roman Catholic prelate, Bishop of Celaya (1988–2003), respiratory disease. 
Soccor Velho, 29, Indian footballer, cardiac arrest.

23
Pat Ashton, 82, English actress (The Benny Hill Show).
Bobby Bland, 83, American blues and soul singer ("Further Up the Road", "Turn On Your Love Light").
Frank Kelso, 79, American naval officer, Chief of Naval Operations (1990–1994), complications from a fall.
Kurt Leichtweiss, 86, German mathematician.
Little Willie Littlefield, 81, American pianist and singer, cancer.
Richard Matheson, 87, American author and screenwriter (I Am Legend, The Shrinking Man, The Twilight Zone).
Ron May, 57, American technology columnist, diabetes.
Darryl Read, 61, British musician, poet and actor, motorcycle accident.
Sharon Stouder, 64, American triple gold medal-winning Olympic swimmer (1964).
 Frank Stranahan, 90, American golfer, winner of The Amateur Championship (1948, 1950).
 Meamea Thomas, 25, I-Kiribati Olympic weightlifter (2004), traffic collision.

24
Mick Aston, 66, British archaeologist (Time Team).
Bill Atkinson, 68, English footballer (Torquay United F.C.).
Cleve Backster, 89, American polygraph expert.
Anibal Barrow, 58, Honduran journalist and news anchor, shot.
John P. Clay, 78, American translator (Clay Sanskrit Library).
Emilio Colombo, 93, Italian politician, Prime Minister (1970–1972).
Papa Malick Diop, 68, Senegalese Olympic basketball player.
Jackie Fargo, 82, American professional wrestler, congenital heart disease.
Mauro Francaviglia, 60, Italian mathematician.
Dame Phyllis Friend, 90, British nursing officer.
Joannes Gijsen, 80, Dutch-Icelandic Roman Catholic prelate, Bishop of Roermond (1972–1993) and Reykjavík (1996–2007), cancer. 
William Hathaway, 89, American politician, member of the US House (1965–1973) and US Senate for Maine (1973–1979).
Lucky Isibor, 36, Nigerian footballer.
Puff Johnson, 40, American pop singer and songwriter, cervical cancer.
James Martin, 79, British author, computer scientist and businessman, swimming accident.
Alan Myers, 58, American New Wave drummer (Devo), brain cancer.
John L. Nickels, 82, American judge, member of the Illinois Supreme Court (1992–1998).
Denham Price, 73, South African cricketer.
Lutfar Rahman Sarkar, 80, Bangladeshi banker, Governor of Bangladesh Bank.
Michael Schwarzwalder, 69, American politician.
Andy Scott, 58, Canadian politician, MP for Fredericton (1993–2009), Solicitor General (1997–1998), cancer.
Vasile Tiță, 85, Romanian Olympic boxer (1952).

25
Gianfranco Baldazzi, 69, Italian lyricist, record producer, author and journalist.
Giuseppe Berton, 80, Italian missionary.
George Burditt, 89, American television writer and producer (Three's Company, Silver Spoons).
Jack Cantoni, 65, French rugby union player.
Sarah Charlesworth, 66, American conceptual artist and photographer, brain aneurysm.
Mark Fisher, 66, British stage designer and ceremony producer (2008, 2012).
Catherine Gibson, 82, Scottish Olympic swimmer (1948).
Robert E. Gilka, 96, American photographer and news executive, director of photography for National Geographic, complications of pneumonia.
Jim Hudson, 70, American football player (New York Jets), traumatic dementia encephalopathy.
*Lau Kar-leung, 76, Chinese Hong Kong martial artist, action choreographer and film director (The 36th Chamber of Shaolin), cancer.
Eddie Liu, 91, Australian community leader.
James Lydon, 84–85, Irish educator and historian.
Harry Parker, 77, American Olympic rower (1960) and Olympic rowing coach (USRowing, Harvard University).
Taghi Rouhani, 93, Iranian news anchor.
Uma Shivakumar, 71, Indian actress.
Mildred Ladner Thompson, 95, American journalist (Wall Street Journal, Associated Press).
Green Wix Unthank, 90, American senior judge, member of the US District Court for Eastern Kentucky (1980–2012).

26

James Allan, 84, Canadian Anglican prelate, Bishop of Keewatin (1974–1991).
Hervé Boussard, 47, French Olympic cyclist (1992), epileptic seizure.
Antonio Jasso, 78, Mexican footballer (national team, Club América).
Edward Huggins Johnstone, 91, Brazilian-born American senior (former chief) judge, member of the US District Court for Western Kentucky (since 1977).
Sandy Knott, 75, American Olympic athlete.
Adam Koppy, 40, American mechanical engineer, traffic collision.
K. Narayana Kurup, 86, Indian politician, Kerala MLA for Vazhoor (1963–1967, 1970–1980, 1984–2005).
Byron Looper, 48, American politician and criminal, cardiac ailment.
Miguel Mansilla, 60, Uruguayan professional footballer, cardiac arrest.
Dumitru Matcovschi, 73, Romanian-born Moldovan poet, complications from brain surgery.
Mal McBean, 91,  Australian rules footballer.
Kimberly McCarthy, 52, American criminal, execution by lethal injection.
Justin Miller, 35, American baseball player (Toronto Blue Jays, San Francisco Giants).
Nilton Pacheco, 92, Brazilian Olympic basketball player (1948).
*Abdul Rahman Mokhtar, 55, Malaysian politician, Terengganu State Representative for Kuala Besut, lung cancer.
Marc Rich, 78, Belgian-born American tax evader, commodities trader and illegal oil broker (Iran Hostage Crisis), stroke.
Bert Stern, 83, American celebrity photographer (The Last Sitting) and documentary maker (Jazz on a Summer's Day).
Rawleigh Warner, Jr., 92, American oil executive, CEO and Chairman of Mobil (1969–1986), inclusion body myositis.
Subhash Yadav, 67, Indian politician, Madhya Pradesh MLA for Kasrawad (since 1993).

27

Shafiq Badr, 87, Lebanese politician, MP for Chouf (1972–1992).
Stefano Borgonovo, 49, Italian footballer, amyotrophic lateral sclerosis.
Henrik Otto Donner, 73, Finnish composer and music industry executive.
Muhammad Emin Er, c. 99, Turkish Islamic scholar.
Josef Geryk, 70, Czech footballer (FC Spartak Trnava).
Dudley Knight, 73, American drama teacher.
Liu Wenjin, 76, Chinese composer of classical Chinese music.
Alain Mimoun, 92, French Olympic runner (1948, 1952, 1956, 1960) and marathon champion (1956).
James Njiru, Kenyan politician, cancer.
Ian Scott, 68, New Zealand painter.
A. C. Shanmughadas, 74, Indian politician, Kerala MLA for Balussery (1970–2003), cardiac arrest.

28

João Alves, 87, Portuguese Roman Catholic prelate, Bishop of Coimbra (1976–2001).
Yiye Ávila, 87, American Puerto Rican televangelist, heart attack.
Thérèse Blondeau, 99, French Olympic swimmer (1936).
Ari Brynjolfsson, 86, Icelandic–born American physicist.
Bhavna Chikhalia, 58, Indian politician, MP for Junagadh (1991–2004), cardiac arrest.
George Hall Dixon, 92, American banker, Deputy Secretary of the Treasury.
Fred Gibson, 101, Jamaican-born English cricketer.
Ted Hood, 86, American yacht skipper (Courageous), judge and official (US Sailing), inducted into America's Cup Hall of Fame (1993), heart failure and pneumonia.
Tamás Katona, 81, Hungarian politician and historian.
Peter Lehmann, 82, Australian vineyard owner and vintner, kidney disease.
Kenneth Minogue, 83, Australian academic and political scientist.
Bob Oliver, 66, American football player (Cleveland Browns), cancer.
Matt Osborne, 55, American professional wrestler (Doink the Clown), accidental overdose of hydrocodone and morphine.
Jacques Planchard, 84, Belgian politician, Governor of Luxembourg (1976–1996).
F.D. Reeve, 84, American academic and author.
David Rubitsky, 96, American World War II veteran, disputed claimant for Medal of Honor.
Charlie L. Russell, 81, American playwright (Five on the Black Hand Side), brother of Bill Russell, gastric cancer.
John Stollery, 83, British engineer and academic.
Silvi Vrait, 62, Estonian singer ("Nagu merelaine") and actress, brain tumor.

29
Khalnazar Agakhanov, 61, Turkmen diplomat and politician, Ambassador to Russia, Germany and Kazakhstan.
Marge Anderson, 81, American Chippewa tribal executive, Chief of the Mille Lacs (1991–2000, 2008–2012), natural causes.
Serge Blanc, 83, French classical violinist.
Harisinh Pratapsinh Chavda, 83, Indian politician, MP for Banaskantha (2004–2008), Gujarat MLA for Danta (1975–1985).
Abdul Mutalib Mohamed Daud, 52, Malaysian journalist, stroke.
Peter Fitzgerald, 76, Irish footballer.
Jack Gotta, 83, American CFL and WFL football player, coach and general manager (Calgary Stampeders, Saskatchewan Roughriders, Birmingham Americans).
Sarah Guyard-Guillot, 31, French acrobat (Cirque du Soleil), fall.
Lou Guzzo, 94, American journalist (Seattle Times), editor (Seattle Post-Intelligencer) and commentator (KIRO-TV).
Margherita Hack, 91,  Italian astrophysicist and popular science writer, suspected heart failure.
Gilma Jiménez, 57, Colombian politician, member of Senate for Bogota, cervical cancer.
Jim Kelly, 67, American martial artist and actor (Enter the Dragon), cancer.
Leopoldo López Escobar, 72–73, Chilean geochemistry academic.
Victor Lundin, 83, American actor (Robinson Crusoe on Mars).
David Moore, 79, British botanist specialising in South American flora and fauna.
Ryūtarō Nakamura, 58, Japanese animation director and storyboard artist (Serial Experiments Lain, Kino's Journey, Sakura Wars), pancreatic cancer.
Paul Smith, 91, American jazz pianist, heart failure.
Jørgen Sønstebø, 91, Norwegian politician.
Larry Townsend, 66, American politician, member of the Vermont House of Representatives (since 2008), cancer.
Kishorchandra Vankavala, 70, Indian politician, Gujarat MLA for Surat West (since 2007), lung cancer.

30
Alan Campbell, Baron Campbell of Alloway, 96, British life peer, barrister and Colditz prisoner.
Akpor Pius Ewherido, 50, Nigerian politician, member of the Senate for Delta Central (since 2011), Delta MLA for Ughelli South (1999–2007), complications from a stroke.
Claudio Fattoretto, 57, Italian voice actor, stroke.
Richard Fehr, 73, Swiss religious leader, Chief Apostle of the New Apostolic Church (1988–2005).
Juggie Heen, 82, American politician, member of the Hawaii House of Representatives (1963–1967, 1969–1971), pancreatic and liver cancer.
William Houle, 81, American Chippewa tribal executive, Chairman of the Fond du Lac (1974–1988), instrumental to Indian gaming in the United States.
Kathryn Morrison, 71, American politician, member of the Wisconsin Senate (1975–1979), breast cancer.
Thompson Oliha, 44, Nigerian footballer (Nigeria Super Eagles), complications from malaria.
Iván Ruttkay, 87, Hungarian Olympic speed skater (1948).
Sir Keith Seaman, 93, Australian viceroy, Governor of South Australia (1977–1982).
Brian Sparks, 82, Welsh police officer and teacher.
Joyce Waley-Cohen, 93, English educationalist and public servant.

References

2013-06
 06